Waigeo is an island in Southwest Papua province of eastern Indonesia. The island is also known as Amberi, or Waigiu. The Dampier Strait (a.k.a. Augusta's Strait) separates it from Batanta, and the Bougainville Strait from the Kawe Islands to its north-west. The "inner sea" that nearly cleaves the island in two is Mayalibit Bay, also known as the Majoli Gulf.

History
Jorge de Menezes, a Portuguese explorer, landed on Waigeo Island in 1526–27.

Islam first arrived in the Raja Ampat archipelago in the 15th century due to political and economic contacts with the Bacan Sultanate. During the 16th and 17th centuries, the Sultante of Tidore had close economic ties with the island. During this period, Islam became firmly established and local chiefs had begun adopting Islam.

Alfred Russel Wallace spent some time on the island and studied the flora and fauna during the late 1850s while on his scientific exploration trip.

Since 1997, the island has been the site of a substantial pearl farming operation owned by the Australian company Atlas Pacific.

Languages
Languages spoken on Waigeo include Papuan Malay, Biak, Ma'ya, and Ambel. Their distributions within the island are given below.

 Ambel is spoken in central Waigeo.
 Ma'ya is spoken in northwest Waigeo.
 Biak is spoken in the southwest and eastern parts of Waigeo.

Fauna and flora
 Waigeo brushturkey (Aepypodius bruijnii)
 Waigeou cuscus (Spilocuscus papuensis)
 Waigeo rainbowfish (Melanotaenia catherinae)
 Waigeo seaperch (Psammoperca waigiensis)
 Wilson's bird-of-paradise (Diphyllodes respublica)
 Golden-spotted tree monitor (Varanus boehmei)
 Achaea simplex
 Hypochlorosis ancharia
 Hypolycaena phorbas
 Karstarma waigeo
 Nepenthes danseri

Protected Areas
 Waigeo Barat Timur Nature Reserve protects much of the island's interior.
 Raja Ampat Marine Park covers Mayalibit Bay in central Waigeo, and parts of the southern and southwestern shores.

References

External links

 

Raja Ampat Islands
Populated places in Indonesia
Islands of Indonesia